The Indian Railways WG class was a type of broad gauge 2-8-2 goods locomotive introduced in the 1950s. 2,450 of the class were built between 1950 and 1970.

History and design
The WG design was introduced in 1950; it utilised identical equipment (boiler, motion, springs, tender bogies, and rear truck) as used in the 4-6-2 WP class passenger locomotives. The first hundred units (No. 8301 to 8400) were built by North British and subcontractor Vulcan Foundry (ten units). Number 8350 was exhibited at the Festival of Britain in 1951.

Locomotives were also sourced from the Société Franco-Belge in Raismes, France, Lokomotivfabrik Floridsdorf in Austria, and from elsewhere in Europe and from Japan. The rolling stock works of Chittaranjan Locomotive Works in West Bengal initially manufactured locomotives from imported parts; by 1953, 70% of the locomotives were domestically produced, and by 1956 the works was able to entirely satisfy the domestic production need for WG locomotives. Production ceased in 1970; the final unit being named Antim Sitara (Last Star).

Preservation

Nine WG's are now preserved in India, WG 9673 is preserved on a pedestal (without its tender) outside Rajendra Nagar Station New Delhi, WG 10253, was plinted at the Zonal Training School Bhusaval, but 2018 removed from the pedestal and sent to Rewari to be restored in working condition, WG 9428 is used at the UP Cement Corporation, WG 9391 is preserved and stored in Burdwan, WG 8258 is preserved on a static pedestal on public display in Sahibganj Junction railway station, WG 10527 is stored in a shed in Burdwan, WG 9286 is preserved by Sri Durga Trading Company,  WG 8407 "Deshbandhu" became the first WG to be preserved into Indian Railway Heritage, it is stored Pedestal along with WG 10560 "Antim Sitara" at Chittaranjan Locomotive Works.

See also

 Indian Railways
 Rail transport in India#History
 Locomotives of India
 Rail transport in India

References

Notes

Bibliography

External links

 
 

Gio. Ansaldo & C. locomotives
Chittaranjan Locomotive Works locomotives
Baldwin locomotives
Floridsdorf locomotives
Franco-Belge locomotives
Henschel locomotives
Hitachi locomotives
Krupp locomotives
NBL locomotives
Railway locomotives introduced in 1950
WG
Vulcan Foundry locomotives
2-8-2 locomotives
5 ft 6 in gauge locomotives
Freight locomotives